Annraoí Ó Liatháin (15 October 1917 - 1981) was an Irish writer and film narrator.

Early life 

Born in Portumna, Co. Galway to Michael Lyons and Annie McKee. His family moved to Waterford when he was a child, and he attended Primary school there. On graduating, he spent five years as a novice with the Congregation of Christian Brothers in Tullow, Co. Carlow, and in Youghal.

Career 

Having left the seminary, he entered the Irish Civil Service in 1936. After a period of time working at the Property Valuation Office, he moved into the dictionary team at the Department of Education (An Roinn Oideachais).

During his career as a writer, he wrote exclusively in his native Irish language. He produced a number of novels aimed at teenagers, as well as collaborated on a number of books on the natural world. He was also president of Conradh na Gaeilge from 1952-1955.

Personal life 

Ó Liatháin married Margaret Fox of Ballymote, Co. Sligo in 1949, and they went on to have eight children.

Bibliography 

 Claíomh an Díoltais
 Cois Móire
 Laochra na Machairí
 An Tíogar Daonna
 Nead na gCreabhar
 Luaithreach an Bhua
 Dún na Cinniúna
 Cois tSiúire
 Buíon Éireannach in Albain
 An Bradán agus Iascaireacht an Bhradáin (Sáirséal agus Dill, 1970)

References 

1917 births
1981 deaths
20th-century Irish people
Irish-language writers
People from Portumna